The Disabled Persons' Parking Places (Scotland) Act 2009 was an Act of the Scottish Parliament to make provision for the duties of local authorities in relation to parking places for use by disabled persons' vehicles, which was passed by Parliament on 26 February 2009 and received Royal Assent on 1 April 2009.

See also
List of Acts of the Scottish Parliament from 1999

References

External links
 

Acts of the Scottish Parliament 2009
Parking law
Disability law in the United Kingdom
Local government in Scotland
Road transport in Scotland
Disability in Scotland